Lawson is an area within Mesquite, Texas, United States; it was formerly a distinct unincorporated community in Dallas County.

Lawson had the names Slapfoot and Haught's Store. By 1982, Mesquite annexed the community.

External links
 LAWSON, TX

Mesquite, Texas
Ghost towns in North Texas